Carobbio may refer to;

People
Filippo Carobbio -Italian footballer

Places
Carobbio degli Angeli Italian town